Bradley John Hodge (born 29 December 1974) is an Australian cricket coach and former cricketer. He was a right-handed batsman who batted in the middle order, as well as a part-time right-arm off-spin bowler.

Hodge was a prolific run-scorer in domestic cricket, holding the records for the most runs (5,597) and most centuries (20) in Australian interstate one-day matches. He is also Victoria's highest ever run-scorer in the Sheffield Shield (10,474 runs). However, his opportunities to represent Australia were limited to 6 Tests, 25 one-day internationals (ODIs) and 15 T20 Internationals.

First-class career
Hodge attended St. Bede's College in Mentone, Victoria. he debuted for the Victorian Bushrangers as a 19-year-old, and was nicknamed "Bunkie" by Dean Jones for the fact that he shared a bunkbed with his brother at the time of his debut.

Hodge played Lancashire League Cricket for Ramsbottom in 2000 and 2001 scoring 1000 runs in each season, breaking the clubs batting record in 2001. His bowling also proved useful.

Hodge has played with County Cricket teams Durham, Lancashire, and Leicestershire – where he made his highest first class score of 302*. During his time at Leicestershire, he was accused of cheating by then-Derbyshire captain, Dominic Cork, by claiming a catch when it appeared that he had stepped over the boundary rope in a Twenty20 match in June 2003. Hodge had actually completed the catch cleanly, before running over to the crowd to celebrate. Hodge denied the accusation and considered taking legal action. Cork was sanctioned by the ECB.

Hodge scored many runs for Victoria, and his consistency came together by the 2000–01 season, where he was consistently overlooked for selection, despite being one of Australia's premier domestic batsmen. He has argued he was the victim of New South Wales selection bias.

On 21 November 2007, playing for Victoria against Queensland, Hodge made his highest Pura Cup score of 286*. He and Nick Jewell had batted undefeated for the entire third day of the game, only the fourth wicketless day's play in the history of the competition.

During the match against Queensland at the MCG on 7 March 2009, he scored 261.  During this innings, he became the 6th batsman to pass 10,000 Sheffield Shield runs.

He also became the first to score a century in Australian domestic Twenty20, scoring 106 off 54 deliveries for Victoria against New South Wales at North Sydney, on 21 January 2006.

In December 2009, Hodge announced his retirement from first-class cricket to focus on the one-day and Twenty20 versions of the game.  Hodge finished his domestic first-class career as Victoria's all-time leading run-scorer. In January 2012, he retired from one-day cricket to focus exclusively on the Twenty20 game. At the time, he was the leading run-scorer in the 2011–12 Ryobi One-Day Cup.

Hodge captained the Adelaide Strikers in the 2016–17 Big Bash League and while the team struggled, he was a model of consistency and named in the team of the tournament at the age of 42.

Australian career
 Hodge was called up as part of Australia's 2005 Ashes squad but was not used throughout the series. He did, however, make a number of catches in the third test as a substitute fielder to get out Kevin Pietersen and Michael Vaughan both off the bowling of Brett Lee. After a long time waiting for an international debut, he finally debuted for the Australian team against the West Indies in November 2005 at Bellerive Oval, Hobart, during the 2005–06 Test Series, becoming the 394th player to wear the baggy green for Australia. He had his baggy green presented to him by Bill Lawry.

Hodge scored his maiden Test century for Australia against South Africa in Perth on 19 December 2005. After ending the third day on 91 not out, Hodge displayed some nervousness in media interviews about reaching his century, but by the end of the innings he managed to finish with an unbeaten score of 203, batting with fluency on day four. This innings was criticised by some Australian fans who felt that captain Ricky Ponting declared too late in allowing Hodge to chase his double century. This criticism came after Australia did not bowl out South Africa in the 4th innings (despite having 120 overs to do so), with the match ending in a draw. Australia were principally thwarted by a resolute Rudolph, who replaced the injured Jacques Kallis.

Hodge later made his One-day International debut, and, after two initial modest scores, he scored a half-century. This earned him a recall for some games against South Africa in the VB Series, although he failed to capitalise and was dropped from the ODI side.

Hodge was dropped after only five tests in the team, and only three tests after scoring his double century against South Africa. The selectors stated that the decision was made on the back of a poor Pura Cup season by Hodge, averaging around 25 for the summer when the team was selected (he finished the season with an average of 33.3). The decision was unpopular amongst Victorian fans, particularly since his replacement, Damien Martyn, had averaged only 23.7 in the same Pura Cup season. He did get back, however, albeit more than two years later, when included in Australia's squad that toured the West Indies in May/June 2008. On 22 May, in what proved to be his final test, he made 67 and 27 with the bat.

Brad Hodge made 99 not out off 86 balls to steer Australia to victory against New Zealand on 4 February 2007, when he was called into the team because Andrew Symonds had pulled out with a torn bicep.

On 18 February 2007, Brad Hodge scored 97 not out off 86 balls as he helped Australia to 4/336 off their 50 overs.

On 18 March 2007, in the World Cup, Hodge scored his maiden one-day century against Holland. He scored 123 off just 89 balls, including 7 sixes and 8 fours and shared a record 4th-wicket partnership of 204 with Michael Clarke, the highest 4th wicket stand in World Cup history.

On 24 March 2007, Hodge was dropped from the Australian ODI side starting 11 in the World Cup, after making a century and being named man of the match in the side's last outing against cricketing minnows, the Netherlands. Andrew Symonds, after recovering from a shoulder injury, was named as his replacement. Hodge later returned to the starting 11 when Shane Watson was injured.

He played for Australia in a Twenty20 against India on 1 February 2008.

In December 2010, Hodge was named in Australia's initial World Cup side for the following year. However, he was not named in the final squad.

In 2012, reflecting on his lack of opportunities to play for Australia, Hodge said: "Selections have puzzled me for a number of years, and continue to puzzle me... I have played the best cricket I can in Test, four-day, one-day, and T20, but for some reason it has not been good enough. That's life."

In January 2012, Hodge announced his decision to retire from One-Day Cricket and also to retire from Victoria. He said in an interview: "I think it's just time to step aside and let some other guys come through; I'm obviously delighted to have played this long. I guess, like anyone in the world, once you've done something for so long, it's hard to let go"

In 2014, Hodge played for Australia in the 2014 ICC World Twenty20 competition.

Later career
In 2022, Hodge was the narrator for Warnie, the posthumous tribute documentary for Shane Warne.

References

External links
 
 DEC Bushrangers Brad Hodge player profile

1974 births
Living people
Adelaide Strikers cricketers
Auckland cricketers
Australian cricket coaches
Australian cricketers
Australian expatriate sportspeople in England
Australia One Day International cricketers
Australia Test cricketers
Australia Twenty20 International cricketers
Fortune Barishal cricketers
Basnahira Cricket Dundee cricketers
Cricketers at the 2007 Cricket World Cup
Cricketers at the 2011 Cricket World Cup
Cricketers from Melbourne
Durham cricketers
Guyana Amazon Warriors cricketers
Indian Premier League coaches
Kochi Tuskers Kerala cricketers
Kolkata Knight Riders cricketers
Lancashire cricketers
Leicestershire cricketers
Melbourne Cricket Club cricketers
Melbourne Renegades cricketers
Melbourne Stars cricketers
Northern Districts cricketers
Peshawar Zalmi cricketers
Rajasthan Royals cricketers
St Kitts and Nevis Patriots cricketers
Victoria cricketers
Wellington cricketers
People from Sandringham, Victoria